Cola scheffleri is a species of flowering plant in the family Malvaceae. It is found only in Tanzania.

References

scheffleri
Endemic flora of Tanzania
Vulnerable flora of Africa
Taxonomy articles created by Polbot